Gymnastics competitions at the 2015 Pan American Games in Toronto were held from 11 to 20 July at the Ricoh Coliseum; due to naming rights the venue was known as the Toronto Coliseum for the duration of the games. The competition was split into three disciplines, artistic, rhythmic and trampoline. Women competed in all three disciplines whereas the men only took part in the artistic and trampoline competitions.

Competition venue

The competitions took place at the Ricoh Coliseum (Toronto Coliseum) located about in CIBC Pan Am Park, about 7 kilometres from the athletes village. The arena had a capacity of about 7,200 people per session.

Competition schedule
The following is the competition schedule for the gymnastics competitions:

Medal table

Medalists

Artistic gymnastics

Men's events

Women's events

Rhythmic gymnastics

Individual

Group

Trampoline

Participating nations
A total of 24 countries entered athletes in at least one discipline. 
Artistic
The following nations participated in artistic gymnastics at the 2015 Pan American Games.

  (8)
  (1)
  (1)
  (2)
  (10)
  (10)
  (1)
  (8)
  (10)
  (1)
  (10)
  (2)
  (2)
  (1)
  (2)
  (1)
  (10)
  (2)
  (4)
  (7)
  (2)
  (10)
  (2)
  (8)

Rhythmic
The following nations participated in rhythmic gymnastics at the 2015 Pan American Games.

  (2)
  (8)
  (8)
  (1)
  (1)
  (7)
  (1)
  (8)
  (8)
  (2)

Trampoline
The following nations participated in trampolining at the 2015 Pan American Games.

  (2)
  (2)
  (4)
  (1)
  (2)
  (4)
  (1)

Qualification

A total of 176 gymnasts are allowed to compete (114 in artistic, 46 in rhythmic and 16 in trampoline). A nation may enter a maximum of 22 athletes across all disciplines (five in each gender for artistic, six athletes in rhythmic group, two in individual and two in each trampoline event).

See also
Pan American Gymnastics Championships
South American Gymnastics Championships
Gymnastics at the 2016 Summer Olympics

References

 
Events at the 2015 Pan American Games
Pan American Games
2015
International gymnastics competitions hosted by Canada